William M. Marchant was a Canadian politician and had been the mayor of Victoria, British Columbia from 1921 to 1922.

References

Mayors of Victoria, British Columbia